La Venganza (The Revenge), is a Spanish-language telenovela produced by the United States-based television network Telemundo, Caracol Televisión and RTI Colombia. This limited-run series ran for 127 episodes from November 4, 2002 to May 16, 2003. The soap opera starred Gabriela Spanic, José Ángel Llamas, and Catherine Siachoque.

Story
On the wedding day of Luis Miguel Ariza and Elena Fontana, a sick woman in her forties and daughter of one of the two mob bosses in the Caribbean town of Matamoros, she realizes that he is involved with her sister Grazzia, Elena's heart cannot take this and she dies. The same night Valentina Diaz who is just a poor but brave woman and a boxer in illegal fights sponsored by the other mob boss: Fernando Valerugo. Valentina dies because of a huge impact on her head during the fight, so Elena mysteriously comes back to life into Valentina's body. Elena has to ask help of a medium friend of her Tobago who helps her to get her life back, but Valentina is still an employee for Fernando Valerugo, so Elena cannot stop boxing and she has to train very hard with Valentina's best friend and trainer Brenda Li just to last toe-to-toe against her opponents in every fight she participates in on behalf of Valerugo. Valentina goes to Fontana's manor as Elena's best friend and using all her knowledge about the Fontanas' family she easily gets the trust of Luis Miguel and Danilo Fontana.

Elena's plan is get even with Grazzia and Luis Miguel but soon she realizes the only responsible is her sister Grazzia, who now sees Valentina as a huge threat for her plans with Luis Miguel and the Fontanas. Grazzia plans to destroy her father by helping Fernando Valerugo so she becomes her lover. Helena while in Fontanas' Manor learns that the daughter she had more than twenty years ago with Fernando Valerugo's son Marco Tulio did not die when she was born, so she decides to find her daughter.

Valentina thinks that a young woman in Valerugo's Manor named Adoración is her daughter. Valentina's brother Paquito is in love with Adoración, but the suspicion that Adoración is the heir both Valerugos and Fontanas make her a target for Fernando's family, her wife Raquel and her son Alfredo. Raquel kidnaps Adoración in order to control the potential heir, but the truth is Adoración is daughter of Father Sebastian (Fernando's brother) so the priest release her daughter and Grazzia learns that Raquel is using her so she kills her. Then Luis Miguel that Fernando's goddaughter Giovanna might be Helena's daughter and in order to confuse the Fontanas Fernando allows them to believe she is Helena's daughter.

Valentina and Luis Miguel starts a romantic relationship, but Valentina's ex-boyfriend and Fernando Valerugo's brother-in-law makes things more complicated and Grazzia takes advantage of her pregnancy with Fernando's baby to keep Luis Miguel with her. Grazzia makes a scheme to blame Valentina for poisoning her and causing a miscarriage, after this episode both Fontanas and Valerugos go after Valentina to kill her. Felipe hides Valentina making everybody believe she is dead, just to prepare her to get her place as the heir of the Fonatanas and the Valerugos. Grazzia convinces Fernando to kill Luis Miguel so she can gain the full rights over the Fontanas' wealth, Luis Miguel is left to die in a lake but Valentina gets to save him. Luis Miguel eventually escapes and he believes Valentina has cheated on him all the time, in the search of Luis Miguel, Valentina is caught by Grazzia who locks her in a basement with no food or water, and finally she orders to set the house in fire, Grazzia believes that Valentina is dead, but Valentina was taken out of the basement by Tobago's husband.

In the basement Elena (in Valentina's body) learns that Luis Miguel married her because he wanted to get back several properties that Danilo Fontana took away from his parents, and the body she owns now it is actually the body of her own daughter. Elena (Valentina) now wants to destroy all the people who made her miserable for so long, in spite of the fact she is pregnant with Luis Miguel's baby. Felipe gets several top secret documents that he uses to blackmail both Valerugos and Fontanas and he ask One Million Dollars to keep the secret. Felipe takes Valentina to Europe with Rosario and Concepcion (who already knows that Valentina is really Elena).

Cast

External links 
 

2002 telenovelas
2002 American television series debuts
2003 American television series endings
2002 Colombian television series debuts
2003 Colombian television series endings
Colombian telenovelas
RTI Producciones telenovelas
Telemundo telenovelas
Caracol Televisión telenovelas
Spanish-language American telenovelas
Television shows set in Bogotá